Chris Hall may refer to:

Chris Hall (English footballer) (born 1986), English television actor and retired footballer
Chris Hall (Australian footballer) (born 1982), Australian rules footballer
Chris Hall (cryptographer), American mathematician and cryptographer
Chris Hall (lacrosse) (1950–2014), Canadian lacrosse player and coach
Chris Hall (defensive back) (born 1970), American football defensive back
Chris Hall (offensive lineman) (born 1987), American football offensive lineman
Chris Hall (university president) (born 1956), English-American politician and academic
Chris Hall (politician) (born 1985), Iowa State Representative
Chris Hall (journalist), sports reporter and presenter for ITV regional news program Granada Reports
Chris Hall, former mayor of Colchester
Christopher Hall (producer) (born 1957), TV producer

See also
Christopher Hall (disambiguation)
Chrishall, a village in England